Michel Bizot is a station on Line 8 of the Paris Métro, named after the Avenue du Général Michel Bizot, which it serves.

The station opened on 5 May 1931 with the extension of the line from  Richelieu–Drouot to Porte de Charenton. The Avenue du Général Michel Bizot takes its name from the French military engineer General  (1795–1855), fatally shot at the siege of Sevastopol during the Crimean War.

Nearby is the Promenade Plantée—a 4.5 km long elevated garden along the abandoned railway which led to the former Gare de la Bastille railway station.

Station layout

Paris Métro stations in the 12th arrondissement of Paris
Railway stations in France opened in 1931